is a Japanese actor known for his stage work, such as playing the title role in Hamlet directed by Yukio Ninagawa, and for playing Hiromichi in the Bollywood Hindi film Rangoon, directed by Vishal Bhardwaj.

Career 
He made his debut in 2007 for the film Water, as a leading role that was shot in 2004 directed/written by Shuichi Yoshida.
Since 2009 to 2014, he had participated in Saitama Next Theatre, headed by producer Yukio Ninagawa. In 2012, he has performed a stage play of Shakespeare's Hamlet, as a main lead, which was praised by Ninagawa as "the best Hamlet acted ever." Then Ninagawa won Grand Prize and Best Directing Award at the 20th Yomiuri Theatre Awards in this work.
In 2017, he portrayed "Hiromichi" in the Bollywood film Rangoon, which was directed by Vishal Bhardwaj, receiving high praise by Indian critics.

Filmography

Film

Television

Stage
 Redon-no-mokuji (2008)
 Sanadafuunroku (2009)
 Utsukushikimono no Densetsu (2010)
 The Taming of the Shrew (2010)
 Saitama Next Theater "Hamlet" (2012)
 Cymbeline (2012)
 Oedipus Rex (2013)
 Like Dorothy (2013)
 Caligula (2014)
 Ikiru to Ikinai no Aida (2014)
 The Soldier's Tale (2016)
 Osei Tojo (2017)
 Shojo Miu (2017)
 After the Quake (2019)
 San-san (2020)

References

External links
Satoru Kawaguchi on IMDb
Official website

1982 births
Living people
Japanese male film actors
Male actors in Hindi cinema
21st-century Japanese male actors